James Reed may refer to:

 James Reed (American football) (born 1977), American football player
 James Reed (soldier) (1724–1807), American military officer in the French and Indian War and the American Revolution
 James A. Reed (politician) (1861–1944), United States Senator from Missouri from 1911 until 1929
 James A. Reed (entrepreneur) (born 1963), executive chairman of the Reed group of companies
 James B. Reed (1881–1935), U.S. Representative from Arkansas
 James Earl Reed (1958–2008), convicted murderer put to death in the state of South Carolina
 James F. Reed (1800–1874), member of the Donner Party
 James Hay Reed (1853–1927), U.S. federal judge
 James Sewall Reed (1832–1864), organizer of Californian Union Army volunteers in the American Civil War
 James Reed (filmmaker), director of My Octopus Teacher (2020)
 James "Jim" Reed, a police officer and lead character in Adam-12 portrayed by Kent McCord

See also
 Jimmy Reed
 Jim Reed (disambiguation)
 James Reid (disambiguation)
 James Read (born 1953), American actor
 Jamie Reed (disambiguation)